Lewis Marshall Long (June 22, 1883 – September 9, 1957) was a U.S. Representative from Illinois.

Born in Gardner, Illinois, Long attended the public schools of Aurora, Illinois, the Plano (Illinois) High School, and the University of Illinois. He graduated from the John Marshall Law School, Chicago, Illinois, in 1929. He was employed as a telegraph operator and station agent at Plano, Illinois, and Sandwich, Illinois from 1904 to 1930. He was admitted to the bar in 1930 and commenced practice in Sandwich, Illinois. He served as member of the board of aldermen from 1922 to 1926. He served as mayor of Sandwich in 1935 and 1936. He served as member of the board of education from 1932 to 1936.

Long was elected as a Democrat to the Seventy-fifth Congress (January 3, 1937 – January 3, 1939). He was an unsuccessful candidate for renomination in 1938 and for election in 1940 to the Seventy-seventh Congress. He resumed the practice of law. He served as chief examiner of the Division of Motor Carriers of the State of Illinois from November 1, 1939, to July 1, 1941, when he resigned to engage in motor carrier practice in addition to law practice. He died in Sandwich, Illinois on September 9, 1957. He was interred in Oak Ridge Cemetery.

References

1883 births
1957 deaths
People from Sandwich, Illinois
People from Gardner, Illinois
University of Illinois Urbana-Champaign alumni
John Marshall Law School (Chicago) alumni
People from Aurora, Illinois
Democratic Party members of the United States House of Representatives from Illinois
Mayors of places in Illinois
School board members in Illinois
20th-century American politicians
People from Plano, Illinois